Oshikuku Constituency is an electoral constituency in the Omusati Region of Namibia. It had 8,089 inhabitants in 2004 and 9,701 registered voters . Its district capital is the village of Oshikuku.

Politics
Oshikuku is traditionally a stronghold of the South West Africa People's Organization (SWAPO) party. In the 2015 local and regional elections SWAPO candidate Modestus Amutse won uncontested and became councillor after no opposition party nominated a candidate. The SWAPO candidate won the 2020 regional election by a large margin. Matheus Gabriel obtained 3,815 votes, followed by Kassian Kanyemba of the Independent Patriots for Change (IPC), an opposition party formed in August 2020, with 607 votes.

References

Constituencies of Omusati Region
States and territories established in 1992
1992 establishments in Namibia